Head porter can refer to:

 the most senior porter at a college
 a porter who uses head-carrying
 a kayayoo (pl. kayayei), a Ghanaian female head-carrier